Oregon Route 501 (OR 501) is an Oregon state highway running from the town of Alsea south 9.49 miles where it abruptly ends and turns into Lobster Valley Road at the intersection of Hazel Glen Road near the Benton-Lane County line. OR 501 is known as the Alsea-Deadwood Highway No. 201 (see Oregon highways and routes).

OR 501 was established in 2002 as part of Oregon's project to assign route numbers to highways that previously were not assigned.  In 2009, ODOT posted route shield signs at both termini and another intersection.

Route description
OR 501 begins at the intersection of OR 34 in the small rural town of Alsea, from there, it heads south through mostly forested, rural land, following the route of the original logging roads making it extremely curvy at its southern end where it abruptly ends and turns into county maintained Lobster Valley Road.

History
The Alsea-Deadwood Highway was originally planned to start in the small logging town of Alsea, travel south through Lobster Valley, continuing to the small logging community of Paris and south to end at OR 36 in Deadwood.  The Highway was never completed south to Paris from Lobster Valley and it was later decided by the Oregon Highway Commission to abandoned any future plans to complete the Highway as originally planned.

The original route of OR 501 was to connect OR 34 in Alsea to OR 36 in Deadwood, hence the name "Alsea-Deadwood Highway".  However, only 16 miles were ever completed on the north end from OR 34 to Preacher Creek Road with approximately 13 miles on the south end from OR 36 leaving an area in the middle unfinished. (Approximately 6 of the original 16 miles of the north side were turned over to Benton County, while the approximate 13 mile section running North from OR 36 was turned over to Lane County, leaving the current 9.49 miles from the small community of Alsea as the only section of OR 501 still maintained by ODOT)

There was a covered bridge built on the Lane County section of the Highway, which was bypassed when it was straightened and turned over to Lane County in the 1960s.  This covered bridge is on the list of historic covered bridges within the state.

ODOT has attempted to turn the Highway over to Benton County for several years, however the Highway is in such poor condition with several locations on active slide areas, Benton County has not been interested in taking over control of the Highway without ODOT bringing it up to meet current Highway standards which would cost several millions of dollars. The potential of having a major slide on the Highway is high due to the fact almost half of the Highway is built on steep unstable ground.

Because of the low traffic volume on the Highway, ODOT has never attempted to straighten, widen or upgrade it, they have also never completely resurfaced it causing it to fall somewhat in disrepair over the years.

According to ODOT statistics and sources, OR 501 is in the poorest condition of any other Oregon highway throughout the entire state.

In 2019, ODOT designated a one-mile section of OR 501 traveling from the town of Alsea south one mile  as part of the "Marys Peak to Pacific" Scenic Byway to Alsea Falls..

Major intersections

References

501
Transportation in Benton County, Oregon